The Mujahideen Shura Council ( Majlis Shūrā Mujāhidīn ash-Sharqīyah, meaning "Shura Council of the Mujahideen of the Eastern Area", also known by the Arabic acronym Mishmish), is a coalition of Islamist rebel groups in Deir ez-Zor which formed in order to fight the Islamic State of Iraq and the Levant (ISIL) during the Syrian Civil War. The leader of the coalition was killed by ISIL around 12 June 2014.

Affiliated groups
 Al-Nusra Front (Deir ez-Zor branch)
 Jaysh al-Islam (Deir ez-Zor branch)
 Ahrar ash-Sham (Deir ez-Zor branch)
 Army of Ahl al-Sunni wal Jamaa
 Authenticity and Development Front (Deir ez-Zor branch - Jaysh Usud al-Sharqiya)
 al-Qa'qa'
 Jabhat al-Jihad wal Bina
 Bayareq al-Shaaitat
 Liwa al-Qadisiya
 Army of Maoata al-Islami
 Army of al-Ikhlas
 Liwa al-Muhajireen wal-Ansar

See also
 List of armed groups in the Syrian Civil War
 Euphrates Islamic Liberation Front

References

External links
  

Anti-government factions of the Syrian civil war
Jihadist groups in Syria